Oscar Verbeeck (6 June 1891 – 13 August 1971) was a Belgian association football player who competed in the 1920 Summer Olympics. He was born in Saint-Josse-ten-Noode. He was a member of the Belgium team, which won the gold medal in the football tournament.

References

External links
Oscar Verbeeck's profile at databaseOlympics
Oscar Verbeeck's profile at Sports Reference.com

1891 births
1971 deaths
People from Saint-Josse-ten-Noode
Belgian footballers
Footballers at the 1920 Summer Olympics
Footballers at the 1924 Summer Olympics
Olympic footballers of Belgium
Olympic gold medalists for Belgium
Belgium international footballers
Olympic medalists in football
Medalists at the 1920 Summer Olympics
Association football defenders
Footballers from Brussels